Yemrehana Krestos Church is an 11th / 12th-century Ethiopian Orthodox church located in Amhara Region, northern Ethiopia. Built of stone and wood, it was erected in the architectural tradition of the ancient Kingdom of Aksum.

Location
Located 12 miles northeast from Lalibela, the church was built in a large northeast-facing cave on the west side of Mount Abuna Yosef. Until the construction of a road in 2000, according to David Phillipson, this church was reachable only after "a long day's arduous journey on foot or mule."

The church is north of a village named after it.

History

The construction of the church is credited to Yemrehana Krestos. The building is notable for its resemblance to the ancient church on Debre Damo, with walls that, according to Phillipson, "show a similar horizontal pattern of inset beams and projecting stonework", with "wooden quoins, door- and window-frames [that] are essentially Aksumite in style". Stuart Munro-Hay believes that the church's interior decorations make "Yimrehana Krestos the most elaborate of all known ancient Ethiopian churches." Mural paintings high on the nave walls are considered the oldest surviving mural paintings in Ethiopia. The cave also contains a second structure north of the church, which tradition describes as a palace or residence of Negus Yemrehana Krestos, but now serves as a residence and storage space for the local priests.

Alvarez left a description of what the church looked like in the early 16th century, in his Prester John of the Indies. Taddesse suggests that construction of this church is related to the record of an Ethiopian delegation that came to Caliph Saladin in 1173, and is recorded as presenting a letter and many gifts to the Caliph; in the Gadla Yemrehana Krestos, there is a passage that relates how he obtained the door from the Caliph's palace for his church. This would agree with Phillipson's dating of this church to either the 11th or 12th century. Paul B. Henze provides a list of several other rock-hewn churches attributed to this king.

South of the church is a tomb which Munro-Hay describes as "a substantial cloth-covered structure", and alongside it a smaller one said to belong to his slave, Ebna Yemrehana Krestos. Munro-Hay reports he was told that in the cave behind the church "are many skeletons of monks and others, who have been buried in this holy spot, some dating from Yimrehana Krestos' time.". Indeed, there is a large area at the back of the cave with numerous skeletons, several wrapped in reed mats. While preservation is generally poor, a few skulls retain their hair.

The entrance of the cave is closed by a modern wall, built in the 1980s to replace an older one.

See also
Wukro Chirkos

References

External links
Yemrehanna Kristos. A Church in a Cave. Amhara Region, Ethiopia. (3D models and photos)

Churches in Ethiopia
Ethiopian Orthodox Tewahedo church buildings
12th-century churches in Ethiopia
12th-century Oriental Orthodox church buildings